The Ausa is a minor river some  long that traverses part of northern San Marino and Emilia–Romagna in Italy. The source of the river is Monte Titano in central San Marino. The river flows northeast past Serravalle and crosses the border into the Italian province of Rimini close to Dogana. The river continues flowing northeast and is channelled through storm drains at Rimini before emptying into the Marecchia.

References

Adriatic Italian coast basins
International rivers of Europe
Rivers of San Marino
Rivers of Italy
Rivers of the Province of Rimini